Kenneth A. Norton (May 7, 1914 - July 11, 1996) was an American college basketball coach. He was the head coach of the Manhattan Jaspers from 1946 to 1968.

Nicknamed "Red", Norton played high school baseball and basketball at Jamaica High School in Queens, and played college basketball under coach Clair Bee at Long Island University (LIU). Norton received a bachelor's degree from LIU, and a master's degree from New York University. He played basketball professionally for the New York Jewels of the American Basketball League. Norton served in the Navy during World War II.

Norton coached Manhattan to a 300–205 record, winning six conference championships and leading the team to eleven postseason appearances, including two Division I National Collegiate Athletic Association (NCAA) and six National Invitation Tournament (NIT) tourneys. At the time of his death, The New York Times reported that he was the top winning coach in the school's history.  His 1957–58 team upset the top seed  West Virginia Mountaineers, led by Jerry West, in the first round of the NCAA tournament.   In the early 1950s Norton guided one of his players, Junius Kellogg, in initiating and assisting an investigation that led to the uncovering of substantial point shaving activity that was taking place in college basketball at the time.  Kellogg had been approached by former Manhattan players Hank Poppe and Jack Byrnes to fix games.

After stepping away from coaching basketball, Norton, who also coached baseball and golf at Manhattan, stayed on as the school’s athletic director until his retirement in 1979. In 1977, he led the Jaspers to the Metropolitan Golf Association (MGA) Intercollegiate Championship.  

Norton was inducted into the Jasper Hall of Fame in 1989.

Norton died in 1996 at age 82 in Hendersonville, North Carolina.

Head coaching record

See also
 CCNY point shaving scandal
 Hotel Roosevelt fire

References

Further reading
 
 
 
 
 
 

Date of birth unknown
1996 deaths
American men's basketball coaches
Manhattan Jaspers baseball coaches
Manhattan Jaspers basketball coaches
LIU Brooklyn Blackbirds baseball players
LIU Brooklyn Blackbirds men's basketball players
American Basketball League (1925–1955) players
American men's basketball players